Bruna Colombetti-Peroncini (27 January 1936 – 26 July 2008) was an Italian fencer. She competed at the 1956, 1960, 1964 and 1968 Olympics in the individual and team foil events and won a team bronze in 1960.

Competitions 

 1956: 29/11/1956 - Olympic Games - Women's Foil: 8th place
 1960: 03/09/1960 - Olympic Games - Women's Foil teams: 3rd place, Bronze Medal
 1964: 15/10/1964 - Olympic Games - Women's Foil: 7th place
 1964: 17/10/1964 - Olympic Games - Women's Foil teams: 4th place
 1968: 24/10/1968 - Olympic Games - Women's Foil teams: 6th place

References

External links

 
 
 

1936 births
2008 deaths
Italian female fencers
Italian foil fencers
Olympic fencers of Italy
Olympic bronze medalists for Italy
Olympic medalists in fencing
Fencers at the 1956 Summer Olympics
Fencers at the 1960 Summer Olympics
Fencers at the 1964 Summer Olympics
Fencers at the 1968 Summer Olympics
Medalists at the 1960 Summer Olympics
Fencers from Milan
20th-century Italian women
21st-century Italian women